Ion Neculai (born 25 January 2001) is a Moldovan-born Italian professional rugby union player who primarily plays prop for Zebre Parma of the United Rugby Championship.

Professional career 
Neculai has previously played for clubs such as I Cavalieri in the past. He signed for Zebre in July 2021 ahead of the 2021–22 United Rugby Championship.

In 2020 and 2021 Neculai was named in Italy U20s squad for annual Six Nations Under 20s Championship. On the 14 October 2021, he was selected by Alessandro Troncon to be part of an Italy A 28-man squad for the 2021 end-of-year rugby union internationals.
On the 30 May 2022, Neculai was selected by Kieran Crowley to be part of an Italy 33-man squad for the 2022 mid-year rugby union tests. He made his debut against Portugal.

References

External links 

2001 births
Living people
Italian rugby union players
Moldovan rugby union players
Zebre Parma players
Rugby union props
Italy international rugby union players
Sportspeople from Chișinău